The Omaha Symphony is a professional orchestra performing more than 200 concerts and presentations annually in Omaha, Nebraska and throughout the orchestra's home region. The orchestra was established in 1921. It is considered a major American orchestra, classified under "Group 2" among the League of American Orchestras, which ranks symphony orchestras by annual budget, with Group 1 the largest and Group 8 the smallest. Its annual budget in 2012 was approximately $7 million. The symphony has a $30 million endowment. The orchestra's home and principal venue is the 2,005-seat Holland Performing Arts Center, the $100 million purpose-built facility designed by Polshek Partnership that opened in October 2005. In a review, The Dallas Morning News called the Holland "one of the country's best-sounding" symphony halls.

Its music director since 2005 is Thomas Wilkins. Wilkins lives in Omaha. He also is principal guest conductor of the Hollywood Bowl Orchestra, which is under the auspices of the Los Angeles Philharmonic. Wilkins also is the Germeshausen Family and Youth Concerts Conductor for the Boston Symphony Orchestra since 2011; the Boston Globe named him among the "Best People and Ideas of 2011." Before his Omaha post, Wilkins was resident conductor of the Detroit Symphony Orchestra. Since the 1992/93 season, Ernest Richardson has served as the Omaha Symphony's resident conductor. Prior to coming to Omaha, Richardson was a violist with the Phoenix Symphony.

In 2002, under the baton of then-Music Director Victor Yampolsky, the orchestra performed the world premiere of Philip Glass's Piano Concerto No. 2 (After Lewis and Clark). It regularly performs with some of the world's most highly regarded musicians, including Itzhak Perlman, Pinchas Zukerman, Joshua Bell and Renee Fleming, whose 1990 performance of Maria Padilla with Opera Omaha, for which the Omaha Symphony is the resident orchestra, is considered a major debut and a springboard for her noted career.

About
The Omaha Symphony presents more than 200 live performances from September through June. Its season series includes: MasterWorks, SymphonyPops, SymphonyJoslyn, Family, Movie Music, SymphonyRocks and a series of special concerts. The orchestra tours the Midwest region each year. The orchestra reaches an estimated audience of 300,000 annually; its concerts also are broadcast on radio in Omaha and throughout the region. The full orchestra includes 92 musicians.

The symphony also performs a six-concert chamber orchestra series at the Joslyn Art Museum.

The orchestra also performs dozens of outreach and school concerts through its Mission: Imagination!, Concerts for Youth, Music Alive!, and Celebrate Creativity programs, reaching more than 40,000 students and preschoolers, among others. Through its participation in the Carnegie Hall Link Up program, the Omaha Symphony reaches an additional 5,000 area youth. The symphony orchestra in 2010 won the Leonard Bernstein Award for Educational Programming, a national honor given by Ascap, or the American Society of Composers, Authors and Publishers. The award is given to an orchestra that focuses on introducing new audiences to new works.

New Music
The orchestra commissioned and performed the world premiere of the Grammy award-winning composer Michael Daugherty's Trail of Tears Flute Concerto. Flautist Amy Porter performed the work with the Omaha orchestra at its premiere on March 26, 2010.

The orchestra commissioned the 2005 Joan Tower work Purple Rhapsody, which the Omaha Symphony also performed in a world premiere in Columbus, Ohio.

In 1978, the orchestra performed the U.S. premiere of Henry Cowell's 1928 Piano Concerto under the baton of then-Music Director Thomas Briccetti.

The symphony each year sponsors the Omaha Symphony New Music Symposium, an international call for new works. In 2012, Pulitzer Prize and Grammy-winning composer William Bolcom judged new works and offered master classes for those selected to participate. The Omaha Symphony Guild sponsors the symposium, and pays the expenses of those chosen to participate. Pulitzer Prize-winning composer Joseph Schwantner also has mentored the participating new music composers. The top prize comes with a $3,000 stipend and a recorded performance with the Omaha Symphony's Chamber Orchestra.

The orchestra each year also plays host to the Omaha Symphony Conductors Symposium, which exposes young conductors from around the world to masters of the craft.

Guild
The Omaha Symphony Guild, made of community volunteers and which exists to support the symphony orchestra, has a mission to, "promote the growth and development of the Omaha Symphony Orchestra for the pleasure and education of residents of Greater Omaha and the States of Nebraska and Iowa." With a history extending since 1956, the Guild has had a hand in organizing a youth symphony, community outreach events and study circles on music, among other activities throughout the region.

Leadership
The music directors of the Omaha Symphony:

 Henry Cox (1921-1924)
 Sandor Harmati (1925-1929)
 Joseph Littau(1930-1932)
 Rudolph Ganz (1936-1941)
 Richard Duncan (1940-1943, 1947-1952, 1954-1958)
 Emil Wishnow (1952-1954)
 Joseph Levine(1959-1969)
 Yuri Krasnapolsky (1970-1974)
 Thomas Briccetti(1975-1984)
 Bruce Hangen(1984-1995)
 Victor Yampolsky (1995-2004)
 Thomas Wilkins (2005–Present)
 Ankush Kumar Bahl (Music Director Designate - Beginning 2021)

History
In 1949, trombone player Helen Jones Woods joined the Omaha Symphony but was dismissed after her father picked her up from a performance, tipping off the orchestra that she was not white.

See also
 Culture in Omaha
 Music in Omaha

References

External links
 Omaha Symphony Orchestra
 Omaha Symphony Guild
 Omaha Symphony Blog
 Omaha Symphony Facebook

Symphony orchestras
Musical groups established in 1921
American orchestras
Musical groups from Omaha, Nebraska
Organizations based in Omaha, Nebraska
Wikipedia requested audio of orchestras
Performing arts in Nebraska